Frederick Ernest Froude (3 July 1910 – 16 June 1978) was an Australian rules footballer who played with Collingwood and coached St Kilda in the Victorian Football League (VFL).

Although Froude played most of his career as a half back flanker, he started as a forward and kicked 30 goals in the 1931 VFL season. He played in five grand finals for three premierships; 1930, 1935 and 1936. In 1948, nine years after retiring, Froude returned to the VFL as coach of St Kilda. Before the war he had been coach of Brighton.

References

1910 births
Australian rules footballers from Tasmania
Collingwood Football Club players
Collingwood Football Club Premiership players
St Kilda Football Club coaches
Brighton Football Club players
Brighton Football Club coaches
1978 deaths
Three-time VFL/AFL Premiership players